The Christ of Atonement and Mercy, popularly known as the Christ of the Lanterns (Spanish: Cristo de los Faroles), is a large Crucifix located at the Plaza de los Capuchinos in Cordoba, Spain.

The sculpture was created in 1794 by the sculptor Juan Navarro León under a commission by the Capuchin friar Diego José de Cádiz. Its popular name comes from the eight lanterns set on iron mounts that illuminate it. The current appearance of the sculpture has developed with the construction of a fence in the 20th century and the replacement of the lanterns with darker ones in 1984.

See also
 List of statues of Jesus

References

Buildings and structures in Córdoba, Spain
Outdoor sculptures in Andalusia
Amstel
Individual crosses and crucifixes
1794 establishments in Spain